is a Japanese former pink film actress and AV idol. She appeared in award-winning pink films, and was herself given a Best Actress award for her work in this genre in 2006.

Life and career
Minami Aoyama was born in Tokyo on May 28, 1982 and began her career as an adult video (AV) actress in 2003 at the age of 21. She made her pink film debut that same year in director Toshiya Ueno's Ambiguous (December 2003), which was the winner of the Best Film award at the Pink Grand Prix. In October 2004, she appeared with AV idol Sora Aoi in the mainstream revenge film  directed by Kōsuke Suzuki. Aoyama had a featured role alongside Mayu Asada and Lemon Hanazawa in the September 2005 J-horror pink film , also known as Kannō byōtō: nureta akai kuchibiru, based on the Japanese urban legend of the Kuchisake-onna.

As an AV actress, Aoyama was nominated for the Best Actress Award at the 2006 Adult Broadcasting Awards ceremony for her work on the Japanese adult satellite TV network SKY PerfecTV! in 2005. Among her more prominent pink film performances was in Shinji Imaoka's Uncle's Paradise, released in May 2006. At the annual Pink Grand Prix, the film was chosen as the eighth best pink release of the year, and Aoyama was given an award as Best Actress. Aoyama was one of the leads in the 2006 mainstream romantic fantasy , which was also released in the United States in May 2007.

Aoyama announced her retirement from AV work at the June 2007 event Momotaro Night 2007! (桃太郎Ｎight！2007) held in Shinjuku, Tokyo. Her retirement was marked by simultaneous releases of videos from the Momotaro and Attackers studios on June 7, 2007 and a special photo session appearance by Aoyama for Attackers.

After her retirement from adult videos, Aoyama continued to make pink films including starring roles in the 2008 Nakagawa Jun Kyōju no Inbina Hibi with Rinako Hirasawa, and director Yoshikazu Katō's November 2009 film , which won the Best Film at the Pink Grand Prix for 2009. Aoyama was also named Best Actress, 2nd place for her performance in this film. Also in 2009, Aoyama won the Best Supporting Actress prize at the Pinky Ribbon Awards.

In addition to appearances on television and in V-cinema, Aoyama also joined "Gesshoku Kagekidan", an avant-garde theatrical group, and in August 2008 performed in a play by Shūji Terayama. In April 2011, Aoyama co-starred with Nao Ayukawa in director Yoshikazu Katō's pink film  and soon afterwards she announced her retirement from the entertainment business and closed her official blog as of June 2011.

Partial filmography

 Ambiguous (December 2003)
 Bitter Sweet (October 2004)
 Uncle's Paradise (May 2006)
 Nakagawa Jun Kyōju no Inbina Hibi'' (March 2008)

References

External links
 Minami Aoyama's official blog (in Japanese) (closed)
 
 

 
|-
! colspan="3" style="background: #DAA520;" | Pink Grand Prix
|-

Living people
1982 births
Actresses from Tokyo
Japanese pornographic film actresses
Pink film actors